Columba (521–597) was an Irish prince who evangelised the Picts, and is one of the patron saints of Scotland.

Columba may also refer to:

Astronomy
 Columba (constellation)
 Columba (Chinese astronomy), a constellation

People
 Columba (given name)

Ships
 RMS Columba, a Clyde paddle steamer launched in 1878
 MV Columba, a car ferry later converted to the cruise ship MV Hebridean Princess

Schools
 Columba Catholic College, Queensland, Australia
 Columba College, Dunedin, New Zealand

Other uses
 Columba (bird), a genus of doves and pigeons
 Columba Project or Columba Initiative, a Gaelic language social program
 Book of Columba or Book of Kells, an illuminated manuscript Gospel book

See also
 Beta Columbae, a star
 Colomba (disambiguation)
 Columbanus
 Columbarium
 Columbia (disambiguation)
 Columbo (disambiguation)
 Kolumba, a museum of Christian art on Cologne, Germany
 St Columb (disambiguation)
 Saint Columba (disambiguation)
 Source Columba, a World War II intelligence operation involving pigeons